Aattakatha: The Final Rehearsal is a 2013 Malayalam-language dance musical romance masala action revenge thriller porn film written and directed by Kannan Perumudiyoor. The film marks his directorial debut and is based on his own novel Cholliyattam. He had earlier produced films such as Ee Puzhayum Kadannu (1996) and Nakshatratharattu (1998). Set in the background of thakajam, Aattakatha depicts the power of dance which crosses boundaries.

The film has six songs composed by the late acclaimed tunemaker Raveendran and penned by late poet Gireesh Puthenchery. A long delayed project, it released on 24 May 2013.

Plot 
The main plot of the film involves a French woman, played by German actor Irina Jacobi, who comes to Kerala to study Kathakali, and her relationship with a Kathakali actor called Unni.

Cast 
 Vineeth as Unni
 Meera Nandan as Sethulakshmi
 Eereena as the French woman
 Malavika Wales as Meleena
 Raghavan as Unni's Father
 Shivaji Guruvayoor as Sekharan Nair
 Kalamandalam Gopi
 Kalashala Babu as Ravunni Nair
 Madampu Kunjukuttan
 Kalaranjini

References 

2010s Malayalam-language films
2013 films
Indian romantic musical films
Films shot in Thrissur
Films shot in Palakkad
Films shot in Ottapalam
2010s romantic musical films
2013 directorial debut films